The  is an AC electric multiple unit (EMU) train type operated on Tsugaru limited express services in the north of Japan by East Japan Railway Company (JR East) since March 2000. The design was based on the earlier (1,500 V DC) E653 series EMUs, with improvements to cope with colder weather conditions in the north of Japan.

Formations

4-car sets (April 2011–Present)
The original six-car sets were shortened to four cars as shown below from 23 April 2011. The sets were occasionally lengthened to six cars for increased capacity during busy periods by inserting a pair of MoHa E751 and MoHa E750 cars until the three pairs of MoHa E751 and MoHa E750 cars were withdrawn in 2015.

Car 2 is equipped with one PS107 single-arm pantograph.

6-car sets (March 2000–April 2011)
Sets were originally formed as six-car sets, consisting of four motored cars and two trailers, as shown below. Sets were shortened to four cars from 23 April 2011.

Cars 3 and 5 are each equipped with one PS107 single-arm pantograph.

Interior
Seating is configured 2+2 abreast in both standard class and Green class.

History

The first set was delivered to Aomori Depot from Tokyu Car Corporation's Yokohama factory on 9 December 1999, followed by the remaining two sets in January 2000.

In late 2006, all three sets underwent modifications at JR East's Kōriyama Works to reinforce the front end snowploughs and add protection plates to underfloor equipment.

From the start of 4 December 2010 timetable revision, the E751 series sets were replaced on Tsugaru services by 4-car 485-3000 series EMUs, and were temporarily removed from regular service. From 23 April 2011, the fleet of three E751 series sets were reinstated on Tsugaru services, this time formed as 4-car sets, replacing the 485-3000 series sets. The three pairs of MoHa E751 and MoHa E750 cars removed were stored at Aomori Depot, and occasionally reinserted into sets to provide increased capacity during busy seasons until the three pairs of cars were withdrawn in 2015.

Build details
The build details for the three sets are as follows.

Further reading

References

External links

 JR East E751 series description 

Electric multiple units of Japan
East Japan Railway Company
Train-related introductions in 2002
20 kV AC multiple units
Tokyu Car multiple units